Love Notes is a  jazz album by Ramsey Lewis, recorded in 1976-77 and released in 1977 on Columbia Records. The album rose to No. 10 on the Billboard Jazz Albums chart and No. 31 on the Billboard Top Soul Albums charts.

Overview
This album features Lewis's collaboration with Motown artist Stevie Wonder on the songs "Spring High" and the title track, which Wonder wrote and arranged.

Track listing

Charts

References

1977 albums
Ramsey Lewis albums
Columbia Records albums
Jazz fusion albums by American artists